Anastasiya Harelik (born ) is a Belarusian volleyball player, playing as an outside-spiker. She is part of the Belarus women's national volleyball team.

She competed at the 2011, 2013 and 2015 Women's European Volleyball Championship. On club level she plays for CS Știința Bacău.

References

External links

1991 births
Living people
Belarusian women's volleyball players
Place of birth missing (living people)
Wing spikers
Belarusian expatriate sportspeople in Russia
Expatriate volleyball players in Russia
Sportspeople from Minsk